The 1777 English cricket season was the sixth in which matches have been awarded retrospective first-class cricket status. The scorecards of six first-class matches have survived. James Aylward made a record score of 167 runs that stood until 1820.

Matches
Six first-class match scorecards survive from 1777, all of them involving Hampshire XIs playing England sides.

18–20 June - England v Hampshire XI - Sevenoaks Vine
7–10 July - Hampshire XI v England - Broadhalfpenny Down
22–26 July - England v Hampshire XI - Laleham Burway
18–20 August - England v Hampshire XI - Guildford Bason
8–10 September - Hampshire XI v England - Broadhalfpenny Down
15–17 September - England v Hampshire XI - Artillery Ground

James Aylward made his record score of 167 in the first England v Hampshire match of the season in June. This set a new record for the highest score in first-class cricket, surpassing the score of 136 made by John Small which had been made in 1775. A printed bill reporting the match said that "Aylward went in at 5 o’clock on Wednesday afternoon, and was not out till after three on Friday" in making his score. The Hampshire total was 403 runs, with Tom Sueter scoring 46 runs, the second highest score in the innings. The match is known to have been played using three stumps, a voluntary measure which had been first introduced in 1775.

Aylward's record stood until 1820, when it was beaten by William Ward, while Hampshire's records (total of 403 and winning margin of an innings and 168 runs) stood until 1793, when Surrey and Sussex scored 453 against England and won by an innings and 299 runs.

Three other matches are known to have been played during the season.

Debutants
The following players made their first known appearance during the 1777 season.

 William Bedster (Surrey and Middlesex)
 Baker (Hampshire)
 Robert Clifford (Kent)
 Holness (Kent)
 Lamborn (Surrey and Hampshire)
 Noah Mann (Hampshire)
 Pemmell (Kent)
 Townsend (Kent)

References

Further reading
 
 
 
 
 

1777 in English cricket
English cricket seasons in the 18th century